Nursultan Mamayev (born 27 June 1993, in Shymkent) is a Kazakh taekwondo practitioner. He competed in the 58 kg event at the 2012 Summer Olympics and was eliminated in the preliminary round by Tamer Bayoumi.

References

External links
 

1993 births
Living people
Kazakhstani male taekwondo practitioners
Olympic taekwondo practitioners of Kazakhstan
Taekwondo practitioners at the 2012 Summer Olympics
People from Shymkent
Taekwondo practitioners at the 2010 Summer Youth Olympics
Asian Games medalists in taekwondo
Taekwondo practitioners at the 2014 Asian Games
Asian Games silver medalists for Kazakhstan
Medalists at the 2014 Asian Games
Universiade medalists in taekwondo
Universiade gold medalists for Kazakhstan
Medalists at the 2015 Summer Universiade
Medalists at the 2017 Summer Universiade
21st-century Kazakhstani people